The 1958–59 season was the 56th season of competitive football in Belgium. RSC Anderlechtois won their 8th Division I title. Standard Liège entered the 1958–59 European Champion Clubs' Cup as Belgian title holder and became the first Belgian club to win a match in European competitions. They eventually reached the quarter finals. RU Saint-Gilloise entered the 1958–60 Inter-Cities Fairs Cup and reached the semifinals. The Belgium national football team played 7 friendly games (3 draws, 4 losses).

Overview
At the end of the season, RRC Tournaisien and R Tilleur FC were relegated to Division II and were replaced by R Daring Club de Bruxelles and RFC Brugeois from Division II.
The bottom 2 clubs in Division II (RFC Renaisien and K Boom FC) were relegated to Division III, to be replaced by RRC de Bruxelles and K Olse Merksem) from Division III.
The bottom 2 clubs of each Division III league (K. Tongeren SC, RCS La Forestoise, RC Lokeren and SCUP Jette) were relegated to Promotion, to be replaced by R Crossing FC Ganshoren, US Centre, U Basse-Sambre-Auvelais and K Hasseltse VV from Promotion.

National team

* Belgium score given first

Key
 H = Home match
 A = Away match
 N = On neutral ground
 F = Friendly
 o.g. = own goal

European competitions
Standard Liège became the first Belgian club to win a match in European competition when they beat Hearts of Scotland on September 3, 1958 (5-1), in the first round of the 1958–59 European Champion Clubs' Cup. In spite of their loss in the second leg (2-1), Standard advanced to the second round, where they defeated Sporting of Portugal (wins 2-3 away and 3-0 at home). In the quarter finals, Standard was eliminated by Stade Reims of France (win 2-0 at home and defeat 3-0 away).

RU Saint-Gilloise entered the 1958–60 Inter-Cities Fairs Cup. They defeated a team from Leipzig of Germany in the first round (win 6-1 at home and defeat 1-0 away). In the quarter finals, RU Saint-Gilloise eliminated AS Roma of Italy with a 2-0 home win followed by a 1-1 draw in Roma. The semifinals were played during the 1959–60 season. The Belgian lost to Birmingham City (two losses by 2-4).

Honours

Final league tables

Premier Division

 1958-59 Top scorer: Victor Wégria (RFC Liégeois) with 26 goals.
 1958 Golden Shoe: Roland Storme (ARA La Gantoise)

References